Dead Woman from Beverly Hills is a 1964 West German drama film directed by Michael Pfleghar and starring Heidelinde Weis, Klausjürgen Wussow and Horst Frank. It was entered into the 1964 Cannes Film Festival.

Cast
 Heidelinde Weis as Lu Sostlov
 Klausjürgen Wussow as C.G.
 Horst Frank as Manning / Dr. Steininger
 Wolfgang Neuss as Ben
 Ernst Fritz Fürbringer as Professor Sostlov
 Peter Schütte as Swendka
 Bruno Dietrich as Peter de Lorm
 Ellen Kessler as a Tiddy Sister
 Alice Kessler as a Tiddy Sister
 Herbert Weissbach as Priest
 Walter Giller

References

External links

1964 films
1964 drama films
West German films
German drama films
1960s German-language films
Films based on works by Curt Goetz
Films directed by Michael Pfleghar
Films set in the United States
Films based on Swiss novels
German satirical films
Constantin Film films
1960s German films